Castletownkindalen is a civil parish in County Westmeath, Ireland.

Castletownkindalen is one of 8 civil parishes in the barony of Moycashel in the Province of Leinster.

Castletownkindalen civil parish comprises the village of Castletown Geoghegan and 41 townlands: Adamstown, Ballybrennan, Ballybrown, Ballyhast, Ballykilroe, Ballynacoska, Ballynagore, Balrath, Benalbit and Derryroe, Bredagh, Castletown, Clonsingle, Cloonagh, Conranstown, Dooraheen, Dromore, Garhy, Glengorm, Gneevebeg, Gneevebrack, Keelbeg, Kilbalraherd, Kilhugh, Killalea, Killeen, Killinlahan, Kippinduff, Knockacurra, Lissakilly, Lurrig, Mabrista, Rathdrishoge, Rathnugent, Shurock, Sraduff, Sraneeg, Teernacreeve, Toorlisnamore, Tullaghanmore, Tullaghansleek and Tullaghnacrossan.

The neighbouring civil parishes are: Churchtown, Conry and  Dysart (all in the barony of Rathconrath) to the north, Clonfad (barony of Fartullagh) to the east, Newtown to the east and south, Kilbeggan to the south and Ardnurcher or Horseleap to the west.

References

External links
Castletownkindalen civil parish at the IreAtlas Townland Data Base
Castletownkindalen civil parish at townlands.ie
Castletownkindalen civil parish at The Placenames Database of Ireland

Civil parishes of County Westmeath